The director of the United States Secret Service is the head of the United States Secret Service, and responsible for the day-to-day operations.

The Secret Service is a federal law enforcement agency that is part of the United States Department of Homeland Security. The service is mandated by Congress to carry out a unique dual mission: safeguarding the financial and critical infrastructure of the United States, and protecting the nation's leaders.

The director is appointed by, and serves at the pleasure of the president of the United States, and is not subject to Senate confirmation. The director reports to the secretary of homeland security, and operates with the general directions thereof. Prior to March 1, 2003, the Secret Service was a part of the United States Department of the Treasury.

History
President Abraham Lincoln signed legislation creating the Secret Service on April 14, 1865, the day of his assassination. It was commissioned on July 5, 1865, in Washington, D.C., as the "Secret Service Division" of the Department of the Treasury. After being appointed by President Andrew Johnson, William P. Wood was sworn in as the first chief of the Secret Service on July 5, 1865 by Secretary of the Treasury Hugh McCulloch.

When the Secret Service was established, its head was called the chief of the Secret Service. In 1965, the title was changed to the director of the Secret Service, four years into the term of James Joseph Rowley (1961–1973). The longest serving head of the Secret Service was William H. Moran, who served under five presidents from 1917 to 1936.

On March 27, 2013, President Barack Obama appointed Julia Pierson to be the twenty-third director of the Secret Service. She became the first female director of the agency. On October 1, 2014, the Secret Service leadership changed to Director Joseph Clancy, a retired agent who formerly led the Presidential Protective Division. On March 4, 2017, Director Joseph Clancy retired, leaving the position vacant until a replacement was nominated by President Donald Trump. Meanwhile, William J. Callahan served as Acting Director of the United States Secret Service from March 4, 2017 to April 25, 2017. Randolph Alles, former acting deputy commissioner of the U.S. Customs and Border Protection, was appointed director by Trump.

List of chiefs and directors

See also

 Chief, IRS Criminal Investigation
 Director of the Central Intelligence Agency
 Director of the Federal Bureau of Investigation
 Director of the United States Marshals Service
 Federal law enforcement in the United States

References

External links

United States Department of Homeland Security
United States Department of the Treasury
United States Secret Service